"Our First President's Quickstep" is a song written by P. Rivinac and published by Blackmar & Bros, a company based out of Augusta, Georgia. The song celebrates President of the Confederacy Jefferson Davis and was published the year he became President, 1861.

References

Notes

Songs of the American Civil War
1861 songs